Ravenga is a small island in Torba Province, Vanuatu, in the Pacific Ocean. The island is also known as Ranenger.

Geography
Ravenga lies 1.2 km off the eastern coast of Vanua Lava. The island has a diameter of about 800 meters, and is surrounded by white sandy beaches. On the northern, eastern, and southern sides of Ravenga, the reef extends offshore about 250 m, and then drops off into deep water.

Name
The name Ravenga comes from the Mota language, which was used as the primary language of the Melanesian Mission. In Mwotlap, it is referred to as Ayven̄  (with the locative prefix a-). All of these terms come from a Proto-Torres-Banks form *Raβeŋa.

References

Torba Province
Islands of Vanuatu
Archipelagoes of the Pacific Ocean